The 2014 Labatt United States Men's Curling Championship was held from March 1 to 8 at the IceWorks Skating Complex in Philadelphia, Pennsylvania. It was held in conjunction with the 2014 United States Women's Curling Championship.

Road to the Nationals

A total of ten teams qualified to participate in the men's national championship through the High Performance Program, through the World Curling Tour Order of Merit, or through a challenge round.

Teams
Ten teams participated in the national championship. The teams are listed as follows:

Round-robin standings
Final round-robin standings

Round-robin results
All draw times are listed in Eastern Standard Time (UTC−7).

Draw 1
Saturday, March 1, 8:30 pm

Draw 2
Sunday, March 2, 12:00 pm

Draw 3
Sunday, March 2, 8:00 pm

Draw 4
Monday, March 3, 4:00 pm

Draw 5
Tuesday, March 4, 8:00 am

Draw 6
Tuesday, March 4, 4:00 pm

Draw 7
Wednesday, March 5, 8:00 am

Draw 8
Wednesday, March 5, 4:00 pm

Draw 9
Thursday, March 6, 8:00 am

Playoffs

1 vs. 2
Friday, March 7, 12:00 pm

3 vs. 4
Friday, March 7, 12:00 pm

Semifinal
Friday, March 7, 8:00 pm

Final
Saturday, March 8, 3:00 pm

References

External links

United States Men's Championship
Sports in Philadelphia
Curling United States Men's Championship
Curling Men's Championship
Curling Men's Championship
United States National Curling Championships
Curling in Pennsylvania